The Revolutionary Democratic Front (FDR) was a coalition of mass organizations in El Salvador. It was aligned with the FMLN guerrilla movement. FDR was formed in 1980, through the merger of the Revolutionary Coordination of the Masses and the Salvadoran Democratic Front.

References

Political history of El Salvador
Political party alliances in El Salvador
Salvadoran Civil War